South Harbor may refer to:

 South Harbour, Nova Scotia, a small community in Nova Scotia, Canada
 South Harbour, Helsinki, Finland's largest passenger harbour
 South Harbor (RTA Rapid Transit station), a station on the RTA Waterfront Line portion of the Blue and Green Lines in Cleveland, Ohio, United States
 South Harbor Township, Minnesota, United States

See also

 North Harbour (disambiguation)
 Southern Harbour
 West Harbour (disambiguation)